The  New York Giants season was the franchise's 20th season in the National Football League.

In an April 2013 article, football analytics website Cold Hard Football Facts named the 1944 Giants the "Stingiest Defense in NFL history," as the team only surrendered 75 points in ten games. "The manpower shortage on NFL fields created a variety of statistical anomalies on both sides of the field," said the article, "and the 1944 Giants are no exception. But even then, the 1944 Giants were a truly awesome unit: the average team scored 18.0 [points per game] in 1944, well above the 7.5 PPG average surrendered by the Giants. [...] But even the best defenses can’t get it done alone: Giants quarterback Arnie Herber threw four interceptions in New York's 14–7 NFL title game loss to Herber's former team, the Packers. The 1944 Giants were a mere No. 5 in scoring offense in the 10-team NFL."

Schedule

Game Summaries

Week Four: at Boston Yanks

Week Five: at Brooklyn Tigers

Week Six: vs Cardinals-Pittsburgh Combine

Week Seven: vs. Philadelphia Eagles

Week Eight: vs. Boston Yanks

Week Nine: at Philadelphia Eagles

Week Ten: vs. Green Bay Packers

Steve Owen won his 100th regular season game as Giants head coach. Tom Coughlin would be the next to accomplish the feat 61 years later.

Week Eleven: vs. Brooklyn Tigers

Week Twelve: vs. Washington Redskins

Week Thirteen: at Washington Redskins

Playoffs

1944 NFL Championship: Green Bay Packers at New York Giants

Standings

See also
List of New York Giants seasons

References

1944 New York Giants season at Pro Football Reference

New York Giants seasons
New York Giants
New York
1940s in Manhattan
Washington Heights, Manhattan